Triumph 1800 may refer to one of the following Triumph automobiles:

 A predecessor of the Triumph Renown Saloon
 A variant of the Triumph Roadster

1800